Ardova Plc (formerly Forte Oil PLC) is an indigenous energy group, headquartered in Lagos, Nigeria, with extended operations in Ghana. It operates majorly in the downstream sector of the Nigeria’s Oil and Gas industry, but has diversified its businesses into other sectors of the energy value chain. The downstream division specializes in the distribution of a wide range of petroleum products; Premium Motor Spirit (PMS), diesel, aviation fuel, kerosene, as well as a range of lubricants for various automobiles and machines; distributed mostly to the automobile, industrial, aviation and marine markets.

History
In 2015 they signed an $83 million contract with Siemens to upgrade the 414 MW plant, the work is due to be completed in 2016

Board of Directors
As of 20 June 2019, Forte Oil's directors include:

Abdulwasiu Sowami - Chairman
Olumide Adeosun - Chief Executive Officer
Moshood Olajide - Chief Financial Officer
Olusola Adeeyo - Non-Executive Director
Durosinmi-Etti Aniola - Non-Executive Director
Aminu Umar - Non-Executive Director

References

External links

 Official website
 Petroleumafrica.com
 Bloomberg.com
 Insideview.com
 Myfinancialintelligence.com
 Broadstreetlagos.com
 Nigerianbest.forum.com
Thisdaylive.com 

Oil and gas companies of Nigeria
Companies based in Lagos
Companies listed on the Nigerian Stock Exchange
Non-renewable resource companies established in 1964
Nigerian brands
Nigerian companies established in 1964